India competed at the 1924 Summer Olympics in Paris, France; this was the third  Olympics where India participated.
Some months ahead of the Olympics, in Feb 1924, the All India Olympic Games (that later became the National Games of India) were held at Delhi.  A few sportsmen from these games were selected to represent India at the 1924 Paris Olympics: Dalip Singh, Lakshmanan, Hinge, Hall, Pala Singh, Pitt, Heathcote, and Venkataraman. The Indian team eventually comprised seven athletes and seven-eight tennis players (including two women), with Harry Crowe Buck as manager. The team trained at the Madras (YMCA) College of Physical Education where Buck was founding principal.

Athletics

Seven athletes represented India in 1924.
Ranks given are within the heat.

Tennis

 Men

 Women

 Mixed

 The mixed double team of Mohammed Salim (Sleem) and Mehri Tata - received a bye in the first round and gave a walkover to Flaquer/De Alvarez in the second round (IFT Report , p. 133).

References
Official Olympic Reports

Nations at the 1924 Summer Olympics
1924
Olympics